The Raji people are a community found in Uttarakhand, India. , the Raji people are classified as a Scheduled Tribe under the Indian government's reservation program of positive discrimination. 

They call themselves Khasa and Bot Tho. Others also call them Forest Raji (Ban Raji) and Forest Rawat (Ban Rawat). They traditionally hunt for a living, especially porcupine and bats, and dig wild yams (Dioscorea spp.) and other forest foods. Some families have a trade agreement with local traders (Bhotiya) to sell their handmade wooden bowls while others have branched out into carpentry, selling other woodenwares such as plowshares and house building planks.

Raji women have also been employed as rock crushers for construction projects. Households who were forcibly settled by the Government of India in the last generation mostly have subsistence-size garden plots and a few cattle as well.

Language
Raji speak a Tibeto-Burman language which they call Bat-Kha among communities in the Pithoragarh region and Bot-Kha in the Champawat region of Uttarakhand. It is classified by linguists as Rawat (ISO 639-3 jnl; Glottocode Rawa1264). It is in the same language sub-group with the languages named Raji spoken in Nepal (ISO 639-3 rji; Glottocode Raji1240) and Raute (ISO 639-3 rau; Glottocode Raut1239) which is also spoken in Nepal. The three languages are currently classified in their own Sino-Tibetan language sub-group called Raji-Raute. This language sub-group shows some affinity to areal Mahakiranti group Himalayish languages such as Kham and Magar.

References

Scheduled Tribes of Uttarakhand